Soorya Kireedam is a 2007 Malayalam language horror film. It was released in 2007.

Plot
An exorcist arrives to save a young girl who is seemingly possessed by a ghost. A young girl begins to behave strangely and displays mysterious powers. This leads her family to believe that she has been possessed by an evil spirit. As things begin to get more dangerous, an exorcist enters. Will he get rid of the ghost or is there something stronger at work?

Cast
Shammi Thilakan as Vishnu Narayanan 
Nishanth Sagar as Goutham 
 Indrajith Sukumaran as Shivaraman
 Remya Nambeesan as Pooja
 Nithya Das as Urmila
 Mamukkoya as Babychan
 Leshoy as Anandan
 Deepika Mohan as Madhavi
 Santhakumari as Januamma
 Meenal as Ashwathy
Sandra Amy as Merlin
Vijay Menon as Dr Venu
Subair as Vishwanatha Menon
V. K. Sreeraman as Prabhakaran
Manu Shivapal as Jayakrishnan
 Shaalin Zoya as Jr. Urmila

References

2007 films
2000s Malayalam-language films